Angeliki Karapataki (born February 19, 1975) is a Greek water polo player and Olympic silver medalist with the Greek national women's team.

She received a silver medal at the 2004 Summer Olympics in Athens.

See also
 List of Olympic medalists in water polo (women)

References

External links

1975 births
Living people
Greek female water polo players
Olympiacos Women's Water Polo Team players
Olympic water polo players of Greece
Water polo players at the 2004 Summer Olympics
Olympic silver medalists for Greece
Olympic medalists in water polo
Medalists at the 2004 Summer Olympics
Water polo players from Athens
21st-century Greek women